Anastase Murekezi (born 15 June 1952) is a Rwandan politician. He studied in Groupe Scolaire Officiel de Butare (GSOB) and went on to the Catholic University of Louvain in Belgium to study agriculture. He was the Minister of Public Service and Labor until 23 July 2014 when he became Prime Minister of Rwanda, serving until 2017. From 2017-2020, he served as Ombudsman of Rwanda.

International associations
Anastase Murekezi is also a member of the Leadership Council of Compact2025, a partnership that develops and disseminates evidence-based advice to politicians and other decision-makers aimed at ending hunger and undernutrition in the coming 10 years.

References

1961 births
Hutu people
Living people
People from Nyaruguru District
Prime Ministers of Rwanda
Rwandan Patriotic Front politicians
Labour ministers of Rwanda